This is a list of butterflies of Guam.

Hesperiidae

Coeliadinae
Badamia exclamationis  (Fabricius, 1775) 
Hasora chromus chromus  (Cramer, 1780)

Hesperiinae
Erionota thrax  (Linnaeus, 1767) 
Taractrocera luzonensis  (Staudinger, 1889)

Papilionidae

Papilioninae
Papilio polytes palewensis  Nakamura, 1933

Pieridae

Coliadinae
Catopsilia pomona  (Fabricius, 1775)

Lycaenidae

Polyommatinae
Catochrysops panormus papuana  Tite, 1959
Lampides boeticus  (Linnaeus, 1767) 
Zizula hylax dampierensis  (Rothschild, 1915)

Nymphalidae

Danainae
Danaus plexippus plexippus  (Linnaeus, 1758) 
Euploea eunice kadu  (von Eschscholtz, 1821) 
Euploea algea eleutho  (Quoy & Gaimard, 1824)

Satyrinae
Melanitis leda ponapensis  Mathew, 1889

Limenitidinae
Neptis hylas guamensis  (Swinhoe, 1916)

Nymphalinae
Hypolimnas bolina nerina  (Fabricius, 1775)

Heliconiinae
Vagrans egestina  (Quoy & Gaimard, 1824)

References
W.John Tennent: A checklist of the butterflies of Melanesia, Micronesia, Polynesia and some adjacent areas. Zootaxa 1178: 1-209 (21 Apr. 2006)

'Butterflies
Guam
Guam
Guam
Butterflies
'Guam